The 2020 NCAA Division III women's basketball tournament was a single-elimination tournament to determine the national champion of the women's NCAA Division III college basketball in the United States. Featuring sixty-four teams, it began on March 6, 2020, following the 2019–20 season, and was to conclude with the championship on March 21 at the Capital University Center Performance Arena in Columbus, Ohio; however, on March 12 the tournament was cancelled due to the coronavirus pandemic.

Qualifying teams

Automatic bids (43)
The following 43 teams were automatic qualifiers for the 2020 NCAA field by virtue of winning their conference's automatic bid.

At-large bids (21)

The following 21 teams were awarded qualification for the 2020 NCAA field by the NCAA Division III Women's Basketball Committee. The committee evaluated teams on the basis of their win-loss percentage, strength of schedule, head-to-head results, results against common opponents, and results against teams included in the NCAA's final regional rankings.

Tournament bracket

Top-left

Bottom-left

Top-right

Bottom-right

Final Four
Those rounds were cancelled.

See also
 2020 NCAA Division I women's basketball tournament
 2020 NCAA Division II women's basketball tournament
 2020 NCAA Division I men's basketball tournament
 2020 NCAA Division II men's basketball tournament
 2020 NCAA Division III men's basketball tournament
 2020 Women's National Invitation Tournament
 2020 National Invitation Tournament
 2020 NAIA Division I women's basketball tournament
 2020 NAIA Division II women's basketball tournament
 2020 NAIA Division I men's basketball tournament
 2020 NAIA Division II men's basketball tournament

References

NCAA Division III women's basketball tournament
Basketball competitions in Ohio
NCAA Division III women's basketball tournament
NCAA Division III women's basketball tournament
Basketball in Columbus, Ohio
21st century in Columbus, Ohio